This is a list of public art in Wiltshire, in England. This list applies only to works of public art accessible in an outdoor public space. For example, this does not include artwork  visible inside a museum.

Alton Barnes

Amesbury
Also including public art in nearby areas.

Bradford on Avon

Calne

Cherhill

Chippenham

Corsham

Cricklade

Devizes

Iford Manor

Longleat

Ludgershall

Marlborough

Pewsey

Royal Wootton Bassett

Salisbury

Stourhead

Swindon

Trowbridge

Warminster

Westbury and Bratton

See also
List of hill figures in Wiltshire

References

Public art
Public art
Wiltshire